Bolesław  is a village in Dąbrowa County, Lesser Poland Voivodeship, in southern Poland. It is the seat of the gmina (administrative district) called Gmina Bolesław.

References

Villages in Dąbrowa County